Rabah Gherbi (رباح غربي, born 3 September 1970) is an Algerian male handball player. He was a member of the Algeria men's national handball team. He was part of the  team at the 1996 Summer Olympics, playing four matches.

References

1970 births
Living people
Algerian male handball players
Handball players at the 1996 Summer Olympics
Olympic handball players of Algeria
21st-century Algerian people